Digital Lies is the fourth full-length album by the  Australian heavy metal band Lord. It was released in Australia on February 22, 2013, by the band's own label Dominus. This was the only Lord album with Damian Costas on drums. After replacing Tim Yatras in 2009, he departed in 2014. The Colombian artist Felipe Machado Franco designed the art, as he had done for the previous two Lord albums.

Track listing

Personnel

 Lord Tim – vocals, guitars, keyboards
 Damian Costas – drums
 Andrew Dowling – bass guitar, backing vocals
 Mark Furtner - guitar, keyboards, backing vocals

References

Lord (band) albums
2013 albums